The Jamali are a Baloch tribe residing in Jaffarabad, Balochistan. The Jamali tribe lives in the southern part of Pakistan. They are mainly settled in the Balochistan and Sindh provinces of Pakistan.

References

External links 

Social groups of Pakistan
Baloch tribes
Sindhi tribes